The   is a Kofun period keyhole-shaped burial mound, located in Mihara ward of the city of Sakai, Osaka in the Kansai region of Japan. The tumulus was designated a National Historic Site of Japan in 1957 with the area under protection expanded in 1978.

Overview
It is located in the wide flat land of the Minamikawachi region between the Furuichi Kofun Cluster and the Furuichi Kofun Cluster. The tumulus has a total length of 73 meters, with a 43-meter diameter posterior circular portion, and is orientated to the west. It was once covered in fukiishi and had rows of cylindrical haniwa. There was a ceremonial platform extending off of the northern edge of the central constriction and the tumulus was surrounded by a moat with a width of 15 meters and depth of two meters. The tumulus is believed to have been associated with the Tajihi clan, a powerful tribe which controlled this area around the mid-fifth century.

In 1946, a pit-type stone burial chamber was detected in the anterior rectangular portion, and this was first excavated in 1947, with five more excavations occurring between 1948 and 2000. Finds included 359 cylindrical haniwa, each measuring 80 centimeters in height by 40 centimeters in diameter, with a  slightly recessed bottom.  In addition, 25 or more lid-shaped haniwa at intervals between the cylindrical haniwa. From within the burial chamber, 24 sets of armor were found, mounted in an upright position in two rows. This is the largest number of armor which has been found at any site in Japan. In addition, there were 24 iron swords, 9 iron spearheads, 6 iron stakes, 56 iron arrowheads, and 5 knives, along with other items. The burial chamber itself was for meters long and was covered by eight sandstone blocks forming the ceiling, and river stones to provide drainage on the floor. The burial chamber which was presumed to have existed in the posterior circular mound was apparently robbed in antiquity, and there is no trace remaining.

The shape of the tumulus was modified when it was used as a fortification in the Sengoku period, by cutting away the sides tomato the slope steeper.

From 1989 the tumulus and its surroundings have been maintained as the Kurohimeyama Tumulus historical plaza, and the pit-type stone burial chamber on the east side of the tumulus and a part of the cylindrical haniwa row in the upper part of the burial mound have been restored. Artifacts excavated from the tumulus are displayed at the Sakai Historical Museum.

The tumulus is about a ten-minute walk from Kawachi-Matsubara Station on the Kintetsu Minami Osaka Line.

Total length 114 meters:
Anterior rectangular portion 65 meters wide x 11.5 meters high, 2-tier
Posterior circular portion 64 meter diameter x 11 meters high, 2-tiers

Gallery

See also
List of Historic Sites of Japan (Osaka)

References

External links

Sakai City home page 
Osaka Tourist Information 

History of Osaka Prefecture
Sakai, Osaka
Historic Sites of Japan
Archaeological sites in Japan
Kofun